On the afternoon of 14 May 1986 in Owen Road, Singapore, two primary school boys, 12-year-old Keh Chin Ann (born 22 March 1974; 郭振安 Guō Zhènān) and his same-age best friend Toh Hong Huat (born 18 May 1974 or 5 June 1974; 卓鸿发 Zhuó Hóngfā), who were classmates from the same school and class, were last known to be walking together to school after Chin Ann fetched Hong Huat from his house nearby their school. The boys were never seen again, and they went missing on that afternoon of 14 May 1986. Since then, investigations and search efforts were made to locate the boys' whereabouts. The case was dubbed the McDonald's boys case due to the Singaporean branch of the fast-food chain McDonald's offering a hefty S$100,000 reward for any information related to the boys' whereabouts.

Countless theories evolved around the reason behind the boys' disappearance, which included possible kidnapping, murder, and even the possibility of the boys running away from home. However, the theories were not proven due to a lack of concrete evidence. The search efforts expanded from Singapore to other neighbouring countries like Malaysia, Indonesia, and Thailand, but the search failed to yield any tangible information relating to the boys' whereabouts. The boys, who were both declared legally dead long ago, were never found. The McDonald's boys case subsequently became known to be one of the most bizarre missing cases that has ever occurred in Singapore.

Disappearance of the boys

Keh Chin Ann

On the afternoon of 14 May 1986, 12-year-old Primary Six student Keh Chin Ann, the youngest of three children and only son of his family, alighted from his school bus and reached his school - Owen Primary School (now defunct since 1989 and demolished), where he was enrolled in the afternoon class shift. One of Chin Ann's classmates, Wang Piwei (王碧伟 Wáng Bìweǐ), was the last person to physically see Chin Ann alive, as he approached Chin Ann, offering to help him take care of his school bag as Chin Ann wanted to go to the nearby shops outside their school to buy something. Piwei then left Chin Ann's bag at the school's tuckshop bench, assuming that Chin Ann would come back to collect it. However, he never saw his classmate again after that moment Chin Ann left the school.

Toh Hong Huat

Chin Ann's 12-year-old best friend and Malaysian-born classmate Toh Hong Huat, who lived with his Malaysian mother Tan Geok Kuan (陈玉娟 Chén Yùjuān) at a house located 500 meters away from his school, was last seen by his mother at his house. According to Tan, Hong Huat, who was her first and only child, went outside the house and told her he was walking to school together with his friend Chin Ann, who came to fetch him. That moment was the last time Tan saw her son ever again. Tan said that it was unlike Hong Huat to not let her accompany him to school as usual that day as he was usually more timid and liked his mother's company in public.

After they met up, the boys however, failed to show up for class at 12:55 pm (SGT) and they were never seen again after 12:30 pm on 14 May 1986.

Investigation and search efforts

Police report and investigations
The form teacher noticed the absence of the two boys Toh Hong Huat and Keh Chin Ann, and informed the boys' parents. By evening, after receiving the call from the school teachers, Hong Huat's 46-year-old mother Tan Geok Kuan and Chin Ann's parents - 51-year-old coffee powder seller Keh Cheng Pan (also named Keh Chin Poh; 郭清保 Guō Qīngbǎo) and 46-year-old housewife Tay Mee Na (郑美娜 Zhèng Meǐnà) - showed up in school out of concern. Wang Piwei, Chin Ann's classmate who last seen him, earlier informed the teachers about Chin Ann's absence. Even though it occurred to the teachers that Hong Huat and Chin Ann may have played truant, however, it was unlikely so because the boys were generally well-behaved and did not miss classes; Hong Huat even ranked the first in his class for the mathematics test. By 7:15 pm, the boys' parents failed to find their sons.

The police were later contacted and they searched the estates surrounding the boys' school for days following their disappearances, but they could not find any helpful information. The police also published and distributed thousands of missing posters of Hong Huat and Chin Ann, which were distributed island-wide in Singapore to urge anyone who had information on the whereabouts of the missing boys to contact the police, and the public media also publicized the case extensively. By May 1988, two years after the boys' disappearance, over a 100 people were interviewed by the police to obtain a lead.

On 27 August 1986, an anonymous informant reported to the police that he saw the missing boys on Pulau Ubin. The Criminal Investigation Department (CID) dispatched nearly 100 officers to Pulau Ubin, splitting the officers into 24 sections and smaller teams to search for the boys throughout the whole island. However, the police were unable to find the boys; the boys' families also joined the search but also found nothing.

A few months after the incident, Hong Huat's mother returned to Kuala Lumpur, Malaysia to search for her son. In 1990, Tan reached out to a local newspaper  and also the Malaysian Chinese Association for help, and the Malaysian authorities also responded to Tan's appeal to search for the boys. In 1987, the Singapore Police Force expanded their search to Malaysia and a few other neighbouring countries like Indonesia and Thailand. The missing boys’ reports have also been sent to Interpol. However, the international search still failed to locate the whereabouts of Hong Huat and Chin Ann.

In November 1988, two years and six months after Chin Ann and Hong Huat went missing, Singapore's national newspaper The Straits Times sent a request for help from an American company based in the United States to recreate a photo of what Chin Ann would physically resemble in his 14-year-old self using facial recognition technology. The request was granted and the photo of Chin Ann, which was published in November 1988, created based on the photo of Chin Ann in his 12-year-old self and also the photo of one of his elder sisters Hui Hong in her 14-year-old self.

In 1994, during the eighth year of the boys' disappearance, the police released the photos of Chin Ann and Hong Huat in their 20-year-old selves, created with the help of facial recognition technology and computer technology.

Rewards
Despite their poverty, the families of Toh Hong Huat and Keh Chin Ann initially offered a S$1,000 reward each to anyone who could provide information about their sons' whereabouts. Both families increased the reward to S$5,000 in July 1986, which later increased to S$20,000 two months later. The families stated that they had no other options but to raise the reward due to their increasing desperation to get any information about their sons' whereabouts.

In October 1986, Managing Director Robert Kwan, who led the Singaporean branch of the fast food chain McDonald's, announced that the company would be offering a S$100,000 reward for any new information on the whereabouts of the two missing boys. They also put up missing posters of the boys and publicised the reward at every outlet of McDonald's across the whole of Singapore.

Theories behind the boys' disappearance
There were several theories that were circulated with regards to the boys' disappearance.

One of the first theories was that the two 12-year-old boys - Toh Hong Huat and Keh Chin Ann - may have run away from home. The boys' parents refuted this theory as their boys were well-behaved and may not have run away. The parents were also doting and loving of their sons, and always gave the boys what they wanted. Also, the boys' allowances and savings were left untouched, and they only have little cash in their possessions, hence it was not possible the boys ran away from home.

Another theory was that the boys were kidnapped and abducted by foreign crime syndicates to other countries, where they were forced to act as beggars after getting their limbs and tongues chopped off. However, there were no reports of children going missing before and after the disappearances of Chin Ann and Hong Huat, and there were no immigration records of children leaving the country around the time the boys disappeared. In 1994, it was reported that there were alleged sightings of the boys begging on the streets of Thailand but there were no concrete evidence to support these sightings. This theory was thus also unproven. The boys' parents also went to Thailand to search for their sons but they failed to locate them.

The next theory was the boys could have been kidnapped for either ransom or revenge, but the boys' parents did not receive any phone calls of anyone demanding for ransom. Also, the families were extremely poor and not well-off: Chin Ann's father Keh Cheng Pan was the sole breadwinner of the family and his salary was barely enough to feed the family, while Hong Huat's mother Tan Geok Kuan herself did not earn much from her job. Besides, the parents did not have any conflicts with people around them; Chin Ann's father was known to be a gentle and well-mannered person who mixed well with others while Hong Huat's mother did not have any problems with people from her social circle despite being a divorced single parent and having an unhappy marriage. Hence, it was also unlikely that someone would kidnap the boys out of revenge against the parents over unsettled scores.

Among the remaining unproven theories, some other theories suggested that the boys were murdered, with each theory suggesting a different motive or reason. One of these murder-related theories suggested that the boys were victims of a ritual killing. In fact, it was reported in September 1986 that Chin Ann's father was hospitalized. Prior to the hospitalization, Keh received a phone call from an unknown person who told him to not look for his son as the caller allegedly said he had killed both Chin Ann and Hong Huat as sacrifice for a religious ritual; Keh later recovered despite having a stroke and slight limp, and had no memory of the phone call. Hong Huat's mother also received a similar phone call, which warned her to not hope for her son's return. Still, there was little evidence to show that the boys may have been killed. The other murder theories were also debunked since there were no bodies found and no probable motive was present to lead to the boys being allegedly killed.

Development of case in later years

Renewed attention of similar case

The 1994 reports of the possible whereabouts of Keh Chin Ann and Toh Hong Huat brought renewed attention to another similar case of a 12-year-old boy who went missing in Singapore back in 1975.

On 14 November 1975, 12-year-old Wong Weng Boon (born 1963, missing since 1975; 黄荣文 Huáng Róngwén) was last seen by his schoolmates leaving school, with only a soccer ball and a $1 dollar coin in his pocket. It was first reported three weeks after his disappearance but there was no significant public attention paid to the case and little developments made to locate him despite police investigations. According to news reports and a documentary, Weng Boon, also called Johnny, was the third child out of four children, and he has two older brothers Wong Weng Soon (born 1957) and Watson Wong (born 1959), and a sister Audrey Wong (born 1967). His father Wong Kim Yew died at age 73 in 2001.

Soon after the 12-year-old boy was reported missing, a friend of Weng Boon's eldest brother Weng Soon claimed he witnessed a boy resembling Weng Boon at a back alley in Bugis several days after he was reported missing, but he also saw two violent-looking male strangers allegedly standing at the boy's side, aggressively driving the friend away. All three of them were gone by the time Weng Boon's family was alerted and led to the alley by the friend.

19 years later, in 1994, Weng Boon's second-eldest brother Watson made a public appeal for information to help locate his brother, after he read news reports of the missing boys Chin Ann and Hong Huat. There were several similarities between the circumstances of the disappearances of Weng Boon in 1975 and the McDonald's Boys in 1986, including the area where they were last seen and the school they attended for elementary school education. Weng Boon's mother Chan Yoke Lin (aged 73 in 2001) also expressed her hope that her son can be found and return to his family, and even went to Thailand to search for her son. Despite the renewed attention to his case and disappearance, Weng Boon still remains missing as of today.

1996 private investigation claims
In 1996, ten years after the boys went missing, private investigator Henry Tay, a former police officer, revealed his own investigation behind the disappearance case of Keh Chin Ann and Toh Hong Huat. He speculated that based on his investigation, it was highly likely the boys went missing due to Hong Huat's father Toh Hoo Don.

It was revealed that Toh, a former gang member, and his wife Tan Geok Kuan, a former bar hostess, were formerly co-owners of a bus company before the financial difficulties led to Toh selling off the buses. The couple argued frequently and eventually, they divorced and Tan got custody of their son and only child Hong Huat; the legal issues also ended with Toh having to pay a huge sum to his ex-wife for selling the buses. Toh, who truly doted on and loved his son, was strongly filled with hatred against Tan for banning him from regularly visiting Hong Huat, hence he would regularly come to Hong Huat's former school (West Hill Primary School) to visit him. Tan, who received word of Toh's visits from the teacher, became fearful that her husband would steal Hong Huat away from her forever so she had transferred Hong Huat to different schools thrice and even moved away from her old address in Sembawang. She also accompanied Hong Huat to school daily even though Hong Huat was slowly approaching the age of twelve; the former school principal Goh Tong Seng confirmed this information in a documentary interview.

From this, the private investigator Henry Tay theorized that Toh might have met Hong Huat on the day he went missing, and took him away; Chin Ann was said to have tagged along with Hong Huat and his father, and it caused both boys to be missing. Also, it was revealed that Tan was not Hong Huat's biological mother. Hong Huat was the illegitimate son of Toh and Toh's former girlfriend from an affair, and since the girlfriend, known as "Samsu", did not want the child, Tan adopted Hong Huat as her own son, and even illegally made a fake birth certificate to claim she was Hong Huat's natural mother. "Samsu" was said to be approached by Toh, who allegedly told her he wanted to take Hong Huat back and raise him.

Following Tay's investigation and revelation, Tan denied that she was not Hong Huat's birth mother, and insisted that Hong Huat was her biological child. Also, Toh was arrested as a suspect behind the disappearances of his son and Chin Ann. However, after 24 hours of interrogation, Toh was released due to lack of evidence to put forward a charge against him.

2010 tip-off
In 2010, the case once again gained attention due to a tip-off. The unidentified informant claimed that he saw the two boys playing with a girl in a garden behind a hospital, before they encountered a man forcibly taking one of the boys, Toh Hong Huat, away, with Keh Chin Ann following the man and asking who he was, with the man replying he was Hong Huat's father. It was rumoured that the boys were taken to Johor in Malaysia, and they lived at a rural village where they allegedly went astray and became gangsters in adulthood. These claims were not proven due to lack of evidence.

Aftermath
The McDonald's boys case grew to become one of Singapore's most mysterious and bizarre missing person cases, together with a few more cases like the 2007 Felicia Teo Wei Ling case (re-classified and confirmed as a murder case in 2020), the 1978 missing social escorts case, and the 1984 missing caretaker case.

As of today, Toh Hong Huat and Keh Chin Ann remained missing and were never found.

Fate of the boys' families
Throughout the following years, the families of Chin Ann and Hong Huat continued to hope that the boys were still alive and would return, despite their sadness over the boys' disappearance. Both families gotten closer to each other due to their common goal to look for their children. In 1993, seven years after the boys' disappearance, both Hong Huat and Chin Ann were automatically declared legally dead by the authorities; under Singapore law, a person should be assumed legally dead once he/she was confirmed to be missing for at least seven years. Still, the families refused to give up hope that the boys would return.

On the side of Hong Huat's family, his mother Tan Geok Kuan, who returned to Malaysia to live, continued to contact the Malaysian authorities for any updates about her son's case. In 1990, Datuk Seri Michael Chong (aged 72 in 2020), who led the Malaysian Chinese Association's (MCA) Public Services and Complaints Department, received a visit from Tan who asked for his help to find her son. Chong, who recounted the case in a 2020 interview, recalled that Tan seemed calm and she looked resigned to fate and seemed to be prepared for the worst about her son's disappearance. After a few phone calls, she never called again. Tan's fate and current status was still unknown as of today.

On the side of Chin Ann's family, the Keh family moved out of their old home in Toa Payoh three years after Chin Ann disappeared, and settled at somewhere in a central part of Singapore. For the next few years, the family would still regularly go back to their old address in case Chin Ann returned or await more news of Chin Ann's case. Chin Ann's parents and two elder sisters were depressed and filled with sadness over Chin Ann's disappearance and welfare, and during the later years of his life, Chin Ann's father Keh Cheng Pan suffered from poor health as his concern for his son took a toll on his health; he had a stroke and also dementia during his elderly years.

According to Chin Ann's mother Tay Mee Na (aged 80 in 2020), who accepted an interview in 2020, her husband Keh Cheng Pan died a few years before 2020. For many years, Tay, who was still alive as of 2020, did not mingle with her neighbours, who all sympathized with her and tried to open up to her. She also spent her time looking at children playing at the void deck and never smiled for more than ten or twenty years. According to her neighbours, Tay, who still missed her son, slowly began to open up and smile to her neighbours more recently before the 2020 interview.

In popular media
In November 1986, Singaporean crime show Crimewatch re-enacted the case of the missing McDonald's boys, and the episode also contained a public appeal for any information about the whereabouts of the boys.

In 2004, 18 years after the disappearances of Toh Hong Huat and Keh Chin Ann, Singaporean documentary series Missing re-enacted the case of the missing boys. In the show's first episode, Chin Ann's then 70-year-old father Keh Cheng Pan was interviewed by the show's production team and he spoke about his depression and sadness over the uncertain fate of his missing son; he still kept the photos of Chin Ann and Hong Huat in his wallet even after 18 years since the boys' disappearance. Loh Gek Siang, a family friend of Keh's parents, also spoke in the show about the distress Chin Ann's parents felt about the disappearance of their son. The show's production team tried to contact Hong Huat's mother Tan Geok Kuan for an on-screen interview, but they could not trace her whereabouts or contact information.

See also
 Death of Felicia Teo
 Death of Ayakannu Marithamuthu
 List of major crimes in Singapore (before 2000)
 List of major crimes in Singapore (2000–present)
 List of people who disappeared

Notes

References

1986 in Singapore
1980s crimes in Singapore
1980s missing person cases
Missing person cases in Singapore
May 1986 events in Asia
Murder in Singapore